Marotolana or Marotaolana may mean several places in Madagascar:
 Marotolana, Ambanja, a commune in Ambanja District, Diana Region.
 Marotolana, Bealanana, a commune in Bealanana District, Sofia Region.